Falsovelleda is a genus of beetles in the family Cerambycidae, containing the following species:

 Falsovelleda congolensis (Hintz, 1911)
 Falsovelleda rufescens (Breuning, 1970)
 Falsovelleda similis Breuning, 1970

References

Acanthocinini
Taxa named by Stephan von Breuning (entomologist)